= PPE Needed =

PPE Needed Logo

PPE Needed is a Dutch "grassroots" initiative to address the global shortage of Personal Protective Equipment (PPE) among frontline workers. The platform was founded by Dunya Ressang and brothers Omar Kbiri and Rachid Kbiri. It is a free-to-use global PPE initiative that, according to its website, seeks "to create an overview of the global PPE shortage during the coronavirus (COVID-19) Crisis and to locally enable matching of supply and shortages of PPE during this crisis".

It started as a Dutch platform with support from the Red Cross. More than 400,000 masks were delivered in a matter of weeks to those fighting the pandemic in the Netherlands, relieving the co-ordination efforts made on a national level. After the Red Cross' initial support, the platform is now backed by Amazon to obtain a global overview of all equipment shortages during the COVID-19 pandemic.
